"Beatlesque" or "Beatles-esque" describes a musical resemblance to the English rock band the Beatles. The term is loosely defined and has been applied inconsistently to a wide variety of disparate artists.

Definitions
To better explain what the word might mean, eight possible answers were formulated by radio producer Kevin Howlett, music professor Rob Bowman, and Klaatu drummer Terry Draper:
 "Penny Lane"-style piano tone clusters (also heard on "Getting Better" and "With a Little Help from My Friends")
 "the big ending", as in "It's All Too Much"
 bluegrass-influenced close harmonies, using fourth intervals
 "I Am the Walrus"-inspired cellos
 the stylistic contrast between Lennon and McCartney
 the left-handed, right-handed drumming; referencing Ringo Starr's habit of playing right-handed drum kits despite being left-handed
 when audiences feel that the band is a continuation of the Beatles, as was the case for Klaatu
 a simulacrum of the Beatles' reputed sound that ultimately means nothing ("a copy without an original").

Toronto Stars Jack Sakamoto has commented: "[Some people's] notion of that sound includes everyone from Panic! at the Disco to Billy Joel to the Red Hot Chili Peppers. With those reference points, it's debatable whether the Beatles themselves would qualify for the adjective their music has spawned." Culture Sonars Scott Freiman argued that anyone who is "Beatlesque" has "got to be a band – not just a singer/songwriter with a backing band ... [but having] multiple songwriters and multiple vocalists".

Writing in 2017, Rolling Stone critic Rob Sheffield identified Paul McCartney as the Beatle whose character best fitted the term "Beatlesque", adding: "If you dislike the Beatles, it's because you dislike Paul. If you love them despite their flaws, you mean Paul's flaws ..."

Associated artists
Notable acts described as "Beatlesque"

Badfinger – The first artists to sign with the Beatles' Apple Records. Their songs "Come and Get It" (1969), "No Matter What" (1970) and "Day After Day" (1971) were produced by McCartney, Beatles road manager Mal Evans, and George Harrison, respectively.
Big Star – Although the American band attracted critical acclaim for its Beatles-influenced work in the 1970s, its life proved contentious and short.  They earned critical acclaim and a cult following despite the lack of commercial success.
The Byrds – Sometimes regarded as the "American Beatles". While their long-term influence has proven to be comparable to that of the Beatles in terms of sound and style, the Byrds failed to match their contemporaries' record sales.
Cheap Trick – Also sometimes known as the "American Beatles". In addition, the group's 1980 album All Shook Up was produced by longtime Beatles producer George Martin, and the group's live performance of Beatles songs culminated with a full orchestra-backed live album, titled Sgt. Pepper Live (2009).
Electric Light Orchestra – Formed explicitly with the intention of "picking up where the Beatles left off", the outfit has proved one of the few Beatlesque groups to achieve sustained commercial success. In addition, frontman Jeff Lynne began a musical collaboration with George Harrison in the late 1980s that led to him working on several projects related to the Beatles. In the early 1970s, John Lennon praised ELO as "sons of Beatles" and cited their 1973 song "Showdown" as a personal favourite.
Harry Nilsson – During a 1968 press conference, the Beatles were asked what their favorite American group was and answered "Nilsson". Sometimes known as "The American Beatle", he was close friends with both John Lennon and Ringo Starr.
Klaatu – Falsely rumoured to be the Beatles themselves, re-formed. The band are sometimes known as the "Canadian Beatles".
Oasis – Their Beatles influence was labelled as an "obsession" by British media. During their 1991 to 2009 career, the band's widespread success in terms of culture and social reach caused it to be possibly the most popular band since the Beatles.
Squeeze – The British band's songwriting pair of Chris Difford and Glenn Tilbrook has attracted comparisons to the Lennon–McCartney partnership. Both Difford and Tilbrook have acknowledged the influence of the comparison on the band's catalogue.

Other

Bee Gees (early years)
Chris Hillman
Marshall Crenshaw
Fountains of Wayne
The Knack
The La's
Los Shakers
Panic! at the Disco (Pretty. Odd. album)
The Sea Nymphs
The Smithereens
Tame Impala 
XTC

See also

 Cultural impact of the Beatles
 Musical style and development of the Beatles
 List of the Beatles' instruments
 The Beatles' recording technology
 Pop rock
 Power pop

References

The Beatles music
20th-century music genres